Albert Ward (1870-1956) was a British screenwriter and film director. He also play the role of William Shakespeare in the 1914 biopic of the playwright's career The Life of Shakespeare.

Selected filmography
Director
 The Pleydell Mystery (1916)
 A Member of Tattersall's (1919)
 The Pride of the Fancy (1920)
 Aunt Rachel (1920)
 The Last Rose of Summer (1920)
 Stable Companions (1922)

References

External links
 

1870 births
1956 deaths
British film directors